Campagna is a town in the Campania region of southern Italy.

Campagna also may refer to:

People

 Girolamo Campagna (1552-1623 or 1625), sculptor
 Louis Campagna (1900–1955), criminal
 Richard Campagna, politician
 Sam Campagna (born 1980), football player

Places

 Campagna Lupia, a town in northeast Italy
 Campagna-de-Sault, a commune in southern France
 Roman Campagna, an area in central Italy

See also
 Campagna Motors, a Canadian company
 Campagna T-Rex, a motorcycle made by Campagna Motors
 National Congress Battalions, also known as the Truppe di Campagna
 Campania (disambiguation)